Zun-Murino (Züün Müren) is a rural locality (a settlement) in Tunkinsky District, Republic of Buryatia, Russia. The population was 979 as of 2010. There are 20 streets.

Geography 
Zun-Murino is located 56 km east of Kyren (the district's administrative centre) by road. Shanay is the nearest rural locality.

References 

Rural localities in Tunkinsky District